The Dark X-Men are a fictional team appearing in American comic books published by Marvel Comics. They made their debut during the crossover between Dark Avengers and Uncanny X-Men written by Matt Fraction, as part of the broader Dark Reign storyline. Each member but Namor has been handpicked by then–H.A.M.M.E.R. director Norman Osborn for his own criminal agenda.

In-universe, the team was never officially called the "Dark X-Men" (which was the name of the comics series, not the team). Instead, they were simply called the "X-Men" and were a government-sponsored team trying to take advantage of the name recognition of Charles Xavier's X-Men, to which they had no official connection (much like Osborn's Avengers team was pretending to be the real Avengers).

Publication history
At the 2009 Emerald City ComiCon, writer Matt Fraction confirmed that the Dark X-Men would not be featured in a title of their own, but would rather be featured in Uncanny X-Men during the crossover with Dark Avengers.

In an April 16 interview with Comic Book Resources, Fraction explained the whole idea behind the Dark X-Men was to create three teams; Norman Osborn's Dark Avengers, Scott Summers's X-Men, and Emma Frost's new "Dark" X-Men.

Comic book writer Jason Aaron stated recently that Mystique will have a short story in the Dark X-Men: The Beginning mini-series, but did not confirm whether or not she would join the team; it was later shown that Mystique was impersonating Professor X to make the media believe Charles Xavier supported Norman Osborn's decisions. Similarly, Dark Beast was mentioned as featured in the first two issues of Dark X-Men: The Beginning, but was not confirmed as member of the Dark X-Men. However, both of them were actually revealed as members of the team (with Mystique impersonating Professor X) in Uncanny X-Men #513, released on July 1, 2009.

Other members of the team Fraction chose include Cloak and Dagger, neither of which have had strong ties to any of the X-Men books. "They're here presented with a chance to have their reputations exonerated and their records sealed [if they join the Dark X-Men]," explains Fraction in an interview with Marvel.com. "Osborn presents it to them as the ultimate public service, [where] they can work off their past indiscretions—[such as] Cloak's dealings with the Avengers during the [Skrull] invasion." Fraction reveals the more appealing part of Dark X-Men was to see how Cloak and Dagger react in a real superhero team scenario. Cloak and Dagger's involvement with the Dark X-Men has put their proposed miniseries on hold.

Another team member worthy of note is Mimic, who sees joining this team as a chance to do some good. Writer James Asmus explained: "To actually be invited onto a team—and one working for the government, no less—gives him a vote of confidence that was sorely needed in his life. Unfortunately for Cal, he doesn't realize he didn't sign up with the good guys." The first issue of Dark X-Men: The Beginning will feature stories about Namor, Mimic and Dark Beast. The second featured stories about Cloak & Dagger, Weapon Omega and Daken. The third featured stories about Emma Frost & Namor, Mystique & Norman trying to recruit Aurora.

Following the conclusion of Utopia a 5-issue mini-series titled Dark X-Men, written by Paul Cornell and illustrated by Leonard Kirk, was published. The team roster consisted of Dark Beast, Mimic, Mystique (no longer impersonating Charles Xavier), and Weapon Omega, and showed the re-emergence of Nate Grey.

Norman Osborn's X-Men
In 2009, a team of X-Men assembled by Norman Osborn during the "Utopia" storyline as part of the overarching "Dark Reign" event.

Collected editions

References

External links

 Marvel unleashes — Dark X-Men, Newsarama blog, April 2, 2009
 X-Position: Nick Lowe, Comic Book Resources, April 15, 2009

Works by Paul Cornell
X-Men supporting characters